Patinoire Michel-Raffoux (English: Michel Raffoux Ice Rink) is an ice rink located in the harbor of Dunkirk, Pas-de-Calais, France. It is the second venue to bear that name after another located in the beach district of Malo-les-Bains, which it replaced. Like its predecessor, it serves as the home venue for ice hockey team Corsaires de Dunkerque.

History
The new building replaces its older namesake, a 56 × 26 metre facility built in 1971 and demolished in 2019. Beyond the name, there is no connection between the two, as the old Patinoire Michel-Raffoux sat near the city's casino and congress center, two kilometers to the northeast of the new one. Both were named in honor of Michel Raffoux (1934 – 1990), a former president of the Corsaires and the French Ice Sports Federation's Northern Minor Hockey League.

Negotiations to replace the aging rink had been ongoing for years when, during a 1 November 2014 game against Reims, an errand puck flew into the unprotected stands and hit 8-year old fan Hugo Vermeersh in the temple, mortally injuring him. The child's death and resulting national media attention lent added gravitas to calls for an up-to-date venue, which received funding from the Communauté urbaine de Dunkerque in late 2015.

The current version was inaugurated in the summer of 2019. It is located on a disused mole in Dunkirk harbor, half a mile west of Dunkirk city centre.

Design
The new Patinoire Michel-Raffoux represented the second phase of the mole's rehabilitation project, following architect :fr:Pierre-Olivier Faloci's remodel of the Halle aux Sucres, a late 19th-century warehouse built by :fr:Paul Friesé, into an information commons.
Patinoire Michel-Raffoux stands next to it, and its proportions are meant to echo those of Faloci's work. As a further nod to the area's industrial background, three of the rink's sides have been covered with aluminum panels that simulate a rusted look. The remaining short side is a 45 × 10 metre wall of glass. Its northerly orientation allows a view on the Halle aux Sucres' central aisle while protecting the recreational rink, which it borders, from excess sun glare.

The building consists of an Olympic-sized track and a smaller recreational track. The main hall is equipped with six VIP boxes, and a restaurant with a row of club-level seats above the home goal. It was designed by Chabanne et Partenaires, who also created ice arenas for the agglomerations of Angers, Cergy-Pontoise and Marseille.

Notable events
2019 French Ice Sports Championships

References

External links
Official website (in French)

Indoor arenas in France
Ice hockey venues in France
Buildings and structures in Dunkirk
Sports venues in Pas-de-Calais
Demolished buildings and structures in France
Sports venues completed in 1971
Sports venues completed in 2019
Sports venues demolished in 2019
21st-century architecture in France